Antonio Turra (25 March, 1730 - 6 September 1796) was an Italian physician and botanist.  

Antonio was born in Vicenza but studied medicine in the University of Padua. His Venetian wife, Elisabetta Caminer, published biographical entries in a contemporary encyclopedia. Antonio set up a printing house in 1780 in Vicenza. Most of Antonio's publications were botanical treatises. He was honored with memberships in scientific societies throughout Italy and Europe.

Works 
 Catalogous plantarum horti Corneliani methodo sexuali dispositus anno MDCCLXXI, atque ab Antonio Turra elaboratus
 Vegetabilia Italiae indígena, methodo linneiano disposita
 Florae italicae prodromus, catalog of around 1700 Italian species, classified always following the method of Linnaeus, to which he added the supplement Insecta vicentina.
 De' modi di procurare la moltiplicazione de' bestiami

References
 Based on translation from Spanish Wikipedia
 https://web.archive.org/web/20090507080003/http://www.anisn.it/vicenza/scuole/botanica/Ragni-Scarlatti/Antonio_Turra.htm

1730 births
1796 deaths
18th-century Italian botanists
18th-century Italian physicians
People from  Vicenza
University of Padua alumni